Island Keeper is a 2021 Chinese biographical film directed and co-written by Chen Li and starring Liu Ye and Gong Zhe. The film follows the story of Wang Jicai and his wife's 32 years of guarding Kaishan Island in east China's Jiangsu province. The film premiered in China on 18 June 2021, to commemorate the 100th anniversary of the Chinese Communist Party.

Cast 
 Liu Ye as Wang Jicai, head of the militia post on Kaishan Island.
 Gong Zhe as Wang Shihua, Wang's wife.
 Hou Yong as Wang Changjie
 Sun Weimin as Wang's father
 Zhang Yishan as Xiao Douzi.
 Chen Chuang as Captain Bao
 Song Chunli
 Tao Huimin
 Ma Shaohua
 Chi Peng
 Xu Yu

Production 
This film was shot in Pingtan Island, southeast China's Fujian province. It took six months to shoot.

Release 
Island Keeper was released on 18 June 2021 in China.

Reception 
Douban, a major Chinese media rating site, gave the film 7.4 out of 10.

Accolades

References

External links 
 
 

2021 films
Mandarin-language films
Chinese biographical films
Films shot in Fujian
Films set in Jiangsu